Annika Duckmark, (born 17 September 1971 in Borås, Västergötland, Sweden) is a Swedish television presenter. She was crowned as Miss Sweden in 1996.

Duckmark represented Sweden at the Miss Universe 1996 where she was ranked 4th overall during the preliminary competition. This ranking enabled her to advance as one of the top 10 semifinalists, ultimately placing 10th overall during the semifinals.

In 1998, Duckmark presented the movie-review show  ”Wide screen” on TV1000.
Duckmark presented the Lotto draw on TV4 each week from 2000 to 2010.

Personal life 
Duckmark was married to the former football player Tomas Brolin before they divorced in 2006.

References

External links
Miss Sweden 1996

1971 births
Living people
Miss Sweden winners
Miss Universe 1996 contestants
People from Borås
Swedish television personalities
Swedish women television presenters
20th-century Swedish women